Who Dares Wins (Latin: Qui audet adipiscitur; , O tolmón niká; ; ; Portuguese: Quem ousa vence; German: Wer wagt, gewinnt) is a motto made popular in the English-speaking world by the British Special Air Service.

The  is attested from at least the 18th century. Slight variations go back further. The same is likely true of other languages.

As motto of the SAS it is normally credited to its founder, Sir David Stirling. Among the SAS themselves, it is sometimes humorously corrupted to "Who cares [who] wins?". 

The expression appears in a medieval Arabic book of fairy tales translated and published in 2014.

The catchphrase "He Who Dares Wins" was commonly used by Del Boy in British sitcom Only Fools and Horses.  The shortened form "Qui Audet" is also heard on the second episode of Pennyworth.

The motto has been used by twelve elite special forces units around the world that in some way have historical ties to the British SAS.

The phrase is the motto of Baron Alvingham of Woodfold in the County Palatine of Lancaster, a title in the Peerage of the United Kingdom.

References

Military mottos